is a junction railway station in the city of Toyota, Aichi, Japan, operated by Meitetsu.

Lines
Umetsubo Station is served by the Meitetsu Mikawa Line and is 18.4  kilometers from the terminus of the line at Chiryū Station. It is also the nominal terminus of the Meitetsu Toyota Line and is 15.2 kilometers from Akaike Station

Station layout
The station has a single elevated island platform with the station building located underneath. The station has automated ticket machines, Manaca automated turnstiles and is unattended.

Platforms

Adjacent stations

|-
!colspan=5|Nagoya Railroad

Station history
Umetsubo Station was opened on October 26, 1923, as a station on the privately owned Mikawa Railway. The Mikawa Railway was merged with Meitetsu on June 1, 1941. On July 29, 1979, the Toyota Line began operations to this station. Umetsubo Station has been unattended since October 1, 2003.

Passenger statistics
In fiscal 2017, the station was used by an average of 6424 passengers daily.

Surrounding area
 Toyota Technical High School
 Japan National Route 153

See also
 List of Railway Stations in Japan
 Aikan-Umetsubo Station

References

External links

 Official web page 

Railway stations in Japan opened in 1923
Railway stations in Aichi Prefecture
Stations of Nagoya Railroad
Toyota, Aichi